The Caledonia Gladiators are a professional women's basketball team based in East Kilbride, Scotland. Formerly known as Caledonia Pride, they are the first and currently only women's professional basketball team in Scotland, competing in the Women's British Basketball League (WBBL).

History
Caledonia Pride (2016-2022)
In May 2016, the Women's British Basketball League awarded a franchise to basketballscotland, seeking to establish a franchise to help better prepare the Scottish national team for the 2018 Commonwealth Games in Gold Coast, Australia. In August 2016, the name Caledonia Pride was chosen and the team's first coach was announced to be Edinburgh University women's head coach Bart Sengers, .

Caledonia Gladiators
In June 2022, basketballscotland announced the transfer of the professional franchise to the Lady Rocks basketball club. The new team was named Caledonia Gladiators, referencing the original name of the Lady Rocks club formed in 2006, with plans for their own custom-built facility in Lanarkshire.

Home Venue
Oriam National Performance Centre (2016-2019)
University of Edinburgh Pleasance Sports Complex (2019–2021)
The Crags Centre (2021-2022)
Lagoon Centre (2022-present)

A purpose built 6500 seater arena is currently under construction in East Kilbride. Due for completion in 2024 this will be the home venue for the Caledonia Gladiators franchise.
 
Home games have also been played at the Grangemouth Sports Complex, Falkirk; Emirates Arena, Glasgow and The Peak, Stirling.

Season-by-season records

Players

Current roster

Honours
WBBL Cup
Runner's Up (1): 2017-2018

References

Basketball teams in Scotland
Women's sports teams in Scotland
Women's British Basketball League teams
Basketball teams established in 2016
2016 establishments in Scotland